The Elsinboro Township School District is a community public school district that serves students in kindergarten through eighth grade from Elsinboro Township, in Salem County, New Jersey, United States.

As of the 2020–21 school year, the district, comprised of one school, had an enrollment of 115 students and 14.3 classroom teachers (on an FTE basis), for a student–teacher ratio of 8.0:1. In the 2016–17 school year, Elsinboro was tied as the 18th-smallest enrollment of any school district in the state, with 129 students.

Elsinboro was one of two districts added to the Interdistrict Public School Choice Program in October 2011, opening up 100 student seats that are available to students from outside the district, who were eligible to apply to attend starting in the 2012-13 school year.

The district is classified by the New Jersey Department of Education as being in District Factor Group "DE", the fifth-highest of eight groupings. District Factor Groups organize districts statewide to allow comparison by common socioeconomic characteristics of the local districts. From lowest socioeconomic status to highest, the categories are A, B, CD, DE, FG, GH, I and J.

Public school students in ninth through twelfth grades attend Salem High School in Salem City, together with students from Lower Alloways Creek Township, Mannington Township and Quinton Township, as part of a sending/receiving relationship with the Salem City School District. As of the 2020–21 school year, the high school had an enrollment of 383 students and 41.0 classroom teachers (on an FTE basis), for a student–teacher ratio of 9.3:1.

School
The Elsinboro Township School had an enrollment of 112 students in grades K-8 in the 2020–21 school year.

Administration
Core members of the district's administration are:
Laural Kretzer, Superintendent
Melanie Allen, Business Administrator / Board Secretary, is the administrator for the Alloway Township School District and performs the same role in Elsinboro Township as part of a shared services agreement.

Board of education
The district's board of education is comprised of seven members who set policy and oversee the fiscal and educational operation of the district through its administration. As a Type II school district, the board's trustees are elected directly by voters to serve three-year terms of office on a staggered basis, with either two or three seats up for election each year held (since 2012) as part of the November general election. The board appoints a superintendent to oversee the district's day-to-day operations and a business administrator to supervise the business functions of the district.

References

External links
Elsinboro Township School

School Data for the Elsinboro Township School, National Center for Education Statistics

Elsinboro Township, New Jersey
New Jersey District Factor Group DE
School districts in Salem County, New Jersey
Public K–8 schools in New Jersey